Anourag is an album of Indian classical music performed by Anoushka Shankar, released in 2000.  Anoushka Shankar's father, sitar master Ravi Shankar, adapted six ragas for her to play on this album.

Track listing 
All songs by Ravi Shankar.

 "Shuddha Sarang"  – 12:38
 "Puriya Dhanashri"  – 11:23
 "Hamsadhwani Tabla Duet"  – 3:54
 "Yaman Kalyan"  – 7:46
 "Swarna Jayanti"  – 5:53
 "Pancham Se Gara"  – 11:48

Personnel 

 Anoushka Shankar: Sitar, vocals
 Ravi Shankar: Sitar
 Sukanya Shankar: Tamboura
 Barry Phillips: Tamboura
 Anthony Karasek: Tamboura
 Bikram Ghosh: Mridangam, tabla
 Tanmoy Bose: Tabla

References 

2000 albums
Anoushka Shankar albums
Hindustani classical music albums